"Hecha Pa' Mi" is a song by Panamanian singer Boza from his debut studio album Más Negro Que Rojo (2020). The song was written by Ceballos and Irving Quintero Valdez (Faster), and produced by the latter. The song was released as the second single from the album on November 20, 2020, alongside its official music video, which was directed by Cristian Aguilar. The song became a commercial success in Latin America, Spain and the United States after earning popularity on the video-sharing app TikTok.

Commercial performance 
Due to the popularity of the song on the video-sharing app TikTok, "Hecha Pa' Mi" gained international chart success, peaking at number one in Venezuela, and reaching the top-ten in twelve Latin American countries, including Colombia, Peru, Chile, Costa Rica and his native Panama. It also reached the top-twenty in Argentina, Paraguay, Ecuador and the Dominican Republic. "Hecha Pa' Mi" became Boza's first entry on the US Billboard Hot Latin Songs chart, peaking at number 36, earning his first top-40 single on the chart.

In Europe, "Hecha Pa' Mi" also performed well, peaking at number five in Spain and being certified two-times Platinum. The song also peaked at number nine in Italy and it was certified Gold. Additionally, it peaked at numbers 20 and 56 in Portugal and Switzerland, respectively.

Charts

Weekly charts

Monthly charts

Year-end charts

Certifications

References 

2020 singles
2020 songs
Spanish-language songs